Etonbury Castle was a castle in the town of Arlesey, located near the road to Baldock, in the county of Bedfordshire, England.

An ancient timber castle, attributed to the Danes, Etonbury Castle had a ringwork and one or two baileys.

The site was destroyed by a railway leading through it. Only cropmarks and some earthworks remain.

See also
Castles in Great Britain and Ireland
List of castles in England

External links 
 English Heritage Monument No. 362445
 Investigation History

Ringwork castles
Castles in Bedfordshire